The following is a list of films produced in the Tamil film industry in India in 1949, in alphabetical order.

1949

References

Films, Tamil
Lists of 1949 films by country or language
1949
1940s Tamil-language films